9V or 9-V may refer to:

Nine-volt battery
Killed by 9V Batteries, an Austrian indie rock band
PG-9V, a model of the SPG-9 gun
9V Avior Airlines - IATA code
Singapore - aircraft registration code

See also
V9 (disambiguation)